Tina Huang, born on October 28, 1981, is an American stage and television actress of Taiwanese descent known for her recurring roles in Rizzoli & Isles and for her semi-regular role as Melinda Trask on the NBC soap Days of Our Lives.

Life and career

Early life 
Huang's parents immigrated to New York City where her two older brothers were born. Then the family moved to Dallas, Texas, where she was born and lived with her mother, brothers and grandfather. Her father went back to New York because he couldn't find work in Dallas at the time. When she turned five, the family moved back to New York. For her, it was a cultural shock moving from the countryside to NYC, and she "felt like I was really intellectually challenged. How lucky was I that I got to go to the Guggenheim or the Metropolitan Museum of Art whenever I wanted?" Huang was raised in Chinatown and in the Lower East Side in New York City.

Being a first generation Taiwanese-American, she is fluent in Mandarin Chinese, and used her language skills to host an episode of the YouTube travel show Resident in Shanghai, although she hesitated to return to her "motherland" after being born and raised in America: "It dawned on me that in Shanghai, I was a foreigner. Maybe that's part of the fear I had coming to Shanghai, to realize I wasn't Chinese".

Education and theatre 
Huang studied theatre at LaGuardia High School of Performing Arts and graduated from NYU's Tisch School of the Arts, She then completed Meisner technique training at The Baron Brown Studios in Santa Monica, California, where she moved in 2003. Huang's practical experiences include travelling for a 14-day cultural exchange with students at the University of the Witwatersrand in South Africa, studying for a semester in Florence, Italy, and performing in an off-Broadway musical called Kaspar Hauser, which was created and directed by Liz Swados. Her stage credits include the award-winning production of Amy Tan's Immortal Heart that toured in the USA and in France in 2010, and the 2012 production of Fairy Tale Theatre: 18 & Over.

Fairy Tale Theatre: 18 & Over garnered positive reviews. The sketch comedy show was created by J. Michael Feldman, based on a collection of "original fairy tales with morals and lessons for adults, such as 'The Tale of the Bipolar Bear' and the "'Co-dependent Eskimo'". The six members of the cast alternate between two shows with a different set of tales. They use hand puppets, camp costumes and a few colourful props, and the fairy tales are told with a "mix of live actors in animal costumes and puppets". The show was played for the past five years at theatres in the Los Angeles area, and was presented at the Edinburgh Festival Fringe in August 2015.

Huang is a founding member of the Ammunition Theater Company in Los Angeles, and she is its present co-artistic director.

Television and film 
Tina Huang first appeared in the television series The Young and the Restless in 2007, and thenafter in numerous television series and films, among them General Hospital (2007-2014), Hollywood Heights (53 episodes), Switched at Birth, Law & Order: LA and Days of Our Lives in recurring roles. She also appeared in Brothers & Sisters, Castle, Criminal Minds, House M.D. and The Office, and in the 2011 comedy film Larry Crowne. Huang's further film credits include Maximum Ride and My Dead Boyfriend in 2016.

Her probably best known role was the recurring character Susie Chang, the senior criminalist of the Boston Police Department's crime laboratory and the assistant of Dr. Maura Isles, in the US crime-series Rizzoli & Isles from 2011 to July 2015. Her 2015 film and television projects included the short film Guiltless, the comedy My Dead Boyfriend alongside Heather Graham, and NBC's serial Night Shift. Besides her theatrical career, in 2016 Huang appeared in the US television series Shameless, Powerhouse and I Own You, as well as Catching the Break, Scandal and The Bold and the Beautiful (6 episodes) in 2017.

Personal life 
Tina Huang's mother was diagnosed with early onset atypical Parkinson's disease. Searching for advice and information, she got in contact with the National Parkinson's Foundation and The Michael J. Fox Foundation for Parkinson's Research. She also supports the Lower Eastside Girls Club of New York, (LESGC) which provides community-based holistic programs and services for girls and young women. As co-director of the Ammunition Theatre Company, Huang supports the company's "mission to reflect the diverse and evolving identity of America and to engage with the community around us."

Huang married Mickey Pentecost on June 18, 2005.

Filmography

Theatre 
 2015: Fairy Tale Theatre: 18 & Over, ACME Theatre/Groundlings Theatre, Los Angeles
 2014: Iamafest, IAMA Theatre Company, Los Angeles
 Mr. Fujiyama's Electric Beach,  Cutting Ball Theater, San Francisco
 Stairway to Heaven, Campo Santo, San Francisco
 2010: Immortal Heart, Word for Word, San Francisco
 2010: Oregon Trail Live!, San Francisco
 Kaspar Hauser, American Theatre of Actors, New York City
 A Midsummer Night's Dream, Wildflower Productions, New York City
 Talk to Me like the Rain and let Me listen, NYU Tisch, New York City
 Machinal, The Currican Theatre, New York City

References

External links 
 
 

Living people
Actresses from New York City
American film actresses
American stage actresses
American television actresses
21st-century American actresses
American actresses of Taiwanese descent
Actresses from Dallas
Tisch School of the Arts alumni
American theatre directors
Women theatre directors
1981 births